Seesaw typically refers to a playground piece of equipment.

Seesaw or See-Saw may also refer to:

Arts

Music
 Seesaw (album), 2013 album by Beth Hart and Joe Bonamassa
See-Saw (group), a Japanese pop group
See-Saw, a 1919 Broadway musical with music by Louis Hirsch
Seesaw (musical), a 1973 Broadway musical

"See Saw" (Don Covay song), a 1965 song by Don Covay, covered by Aretha Franklin in 1968
"See-Saw" (song), a 1968 song by Pink Floyd
"See Saw", a 2018 song by Loona from Go Won

Television and film
SeeSaw (Internet television), a former Internet television venture by Arqiva
See-Saw (TV programme), a strand of programmes shown in the UK during the 1980s
"See-Saw", a 1997 episode of the series Teletubbies
 See-Saw Films, a British-Australian film and television production company
Seesaw (TV series), an adaptation of the Moggach novel

Other media
Seesaw (Moggach novel) a 1996 novel by Deborah Moggach (also its 1998 television adaptation)
Seesaw (Ogene novel), a 2021 novel by Timothy Ogene
See saw, an uncommon contra dance move, similar to a dosido

Science
Seesaw mechanism, a theoretical mechanism in particle physics
Seesaw molecular geometry in chemistry
Seesaw theorem in mathematics

Other
 Seesaw (chess), a tactic in chess

See also 
"Ride My See-Saw", a song from The Moody Blues' 1968 album In Search of the Lost Chord
"See Saw Margery Daw", a nursery rhyme